Narek Seferjan (born August 20, 1974) is a Russian by nationality ethnic Armenian chess Grandmaster, journalist and script writer. Seferjan graduated from the Russian State University of Physical Culture and Diplomatic Academy of the Ministry of Foreign Affairs of the Russian Federation.

Chess achievements

Prize winner of such international tournaments as:

Moscow Youth Champion – 1987
U.S. Open Concord, USA – 1995
North American Open – 1995
Seventh Goldberg Memorial, Moscow – 1996
Twelfth Goldberg Memorial, Moscow – 1998
Moscow International – 1998
Estrin Memorial – 1998

Journalist
Correspondent and observer for numerous print media, worked in war zones. Sphere of interest – international affairs.
TV correspondent since 2003. 2006 – international observer for «Rossija 24» TV News Channel.

Businessman
2014 - deputy director of a joint-stock logistics company.

References

External links 
 Personal card at 365chess.com
 Interview
 Interview

1974 births
Living people
Chess grandmasters
Diplomatic Academy of the Ministry of Foreign Affairs of the Russian Federation alumni
Writers from Moscow
Russian chess players
Russian people of Armenian descent
Russian journalists